The 1896 Army Cadets football team represented the United States Military Academy in the 1896 college football season. In their first and only season under head coach George P. Dyer, the Cadets compiled a 3–2–1 record and outscored their opponents by a combined total of 93 to 45.  The Army–Navy Game was not played in 1896.

No Army Cadets were honored on the 1896 College Football All-America Team.

Schedule

References

Army
Army Black Knights football seasons
Army Cadets football